David Antônio Abisai Pereira de Almeida, (born February 8, 1969) better known as David Almeida, is a Brazilian lawyer and politician affiliated to the Avante. He was elected mayor of Manaus in the municipal elections of Brazil in 2020. In 2017 he was interim Governor of Amazonas after the annulment of José Melo de Oliveira and his vice-governor by TSE (Superior Electoral Court), due to problems in Brazilian justice. The Brazilian Constitution establishes that the annulment of a governor and his vice-governor, temporarily declares the presidency of the Legislative Assembly during the year, until the supplementary internal elections, from which they occurred in 2017, at the time Almeida was president of the legislative authority of the state of Amazonas. In 2020, David Almeida was elected mayor of the city of Manaus by the Avante, turning over the votes in the second round on Amazonino Mendes, of PODE, which ended first in the first round, succeeding Arthur Virgílio Neto, for the 2021–2025 term.

References

1969 births
Living people
People from Manaus
Mayors of Manaus
Governors of Amazonas (Brazilian state)
Members of the Legislative Assembly of Amazonas